Danny Wheeler is an international DJ and drum & bass producer from west London. Danny Wheeler's debut; "Ghost & Lost Highway", launched him and co-producer, Sub Focus, into the Top 5 of the UK Dance Charts and Top 20 of the Indie Charts. He was featured in the Guinness Book of Records as one of the DJs who broke the world record for the most DJs to consecutively mix one record, live on BBC Radio. Wheeler is also the owner of W10 Records.

Discography 

2004 Sub Focus & Danny Wheeler – Ghost / Lost Highway 
2005 Danny Wheeler & Brookes Brothers – Aura // Blue Light 
2008 Danny Wheeler Feat. Blu James – 100 Times / Stargate 
2009 Danny Wheeler Feat. Kathy Brown – Money / Airforce
2011 Danny Wheeler & Suitboys, The / Danny Wheeler & Steelo – Universal Language LP Sampler 
2011 Danny Wheeler / Danny Wheeler & Steelo – Universal Language 
2012 Makoto, Danny Wheeler, Velocity & Loz Contreras – HE:Jam 2 
2016 Makoto & Danny Wheeler – Midnight Hour / Sunshine

References

External links
Official website
Official website

British DJs
Living people
Year of birth missing (living people)